is an ancient Shinto shrine in Hino, Tottori Prefecture, Japan. Its name is regarded as auspicious.

References

External links
 Kamochi Jinja homepage

Shinto shrines in Tottori Prefecture
Hino, Tottori